Ústí nad Labem is a city in the Czech Republic. It has about 92,000 inhabitants and is the capital of the Ústí nad Labem Region. It is a major industrial centre and, besides being an active river port, is an important railway junction.

Administrative division
Ústí nad Labem is divided into four boroughs, which are further divided into 22 administrative parts:
Ústí nad Labem-město (parts Ústí nad Labem-centrum, Božtěšice, Bukov, Habrovice, Hostovice, Klíše, Předlice, Skorotice, Strážky, Vaňov and Všebořice);
Ústí nad Labem-Neštěmice (parts Krásné Březno, Mojžíř and Neštěmice);
Ústí nad Labem-Severní terasa (part Severní Terasa);
Ústí nad Labem-Střekov (parts Brná, Církvice, Kojetice, Olešnice, Sebuzín, Střekov and Svádov).

Etymology
It thus literally means "Mouth-upon-the-Elbe", in reference to its location at the Bílina's confluence with the Elbe. It is popularly known as Ústí for short.

Before Czechoslovak independence amid the dissolution of Austria-Hungary following the World War I, the town was usually known in English as Aussig, but sometimes also referred to as Aussyenad, Labem, or Oustí nad Labem.

Geography
It lies mostly in a hilly landscape of the Central Bohemian Uplands, but it also extends into the Most Basin in the northwest. The highest peak is Široký Vrch with an elevation of ). The city is situated at the confluence of the rivers Elbe and Bílina. Half of Lake Milada lies in the municipal territory. The southern part of the territory lies in the České Středohoří Protected Landscape Area.

History
For years, the charter of the Prague Benedictine monastery from 993 was considered to be the first written mention of Ústí nad Labem, but it has been proven to be a hoax. The first verificated written mention is in the charter of the chapter at the Church of St. Stephen in Litoměřice, dated to 1056 or 1057. In 1249, it was first mentioned with the title of royal town.

In the second half of the 13th century, King Ottokar II of Bohemia invited German settlers into the country and granted them a German form of municipal incorporation, thereby founding the city proper. In 1423, as King of Bohemia, Sigismund  pledged the town to Elector Frederick I of Meissen, who occupied it with a Saxon garrison. It was besieged by the Hussites in 1426: a German army of 70,000 was sent to its relief but the 25,000 besiegers defeated them amid great slaughter on 16 June; the next day, they stormed and razed the town. It was left derelict for three years before rebuilding began in 1429.

Ústí nad Labem was again burned down in 1583 and was sacked by the Swedes in 1639 amid the Thirty Years' War. It also suffered grievously during the Seven Years' War and was near the 1813 Battle of Kulm between France and the alliance of Austria, Prussia, and Russia during the Napoleonic Wars. As late as 1830, its population was only 1400.

As part of the Kingdom of Bohemia, it was eventually incorporated into Austria and heavily industrialized over the 19th century. After the Compromise of 1867, it headed the Aussig District, one of Austrian Bohemia's 94 District Commissions. In the 1870s, with only 11,000 people, it was a major producer of woolen goods, linen, paper, ships, and chemicals and carried on a large trade in grain, fruit, mineral water, lumber, and coal. By 1900, large-scale immigration had boosted the population to nearly 40,000, mostly German, and added glassworking and stone to its trades. The local river port became the busiest in the entire Austro-Hungarian Empire, surpassing even the seaport in Trieste.

The factories of Aussig—as it was then known—were an early center of the National Socialism ("Nazi") movement. The German Workers' Party in Austria was founded on 15 November 1903 and later gave rise to the Sudeten German Party and Austrian National Socialism. Their books continued to be printed in Ústí nad Labem even after the formation of Czechoslovakia in 1918. During the 1930 census, Ústí nad Labem was home to 43,793 residents: 32,878 considered German, 8,735 Czech or Slovak, 222 Jews, 16 Russians, and 11 Hungarians. Ústí nad Labem was ceded to Nazi Germany with the rest of the Sudetenland in October 1938 under the terms of the Munich Agreement and placed under the administration of the Regierungsbezirk Aussig of Reichsgau Sudetenland. On New Year's Eve of that year, the Nazis burnt down the local synagogue; a meat factory was later raised in its place. The Jewish community in Ústí nad Labem was mostly exterminated over the course of World War II amid the Holocaust. In April 1945, the city was severely bombed by the Allies.

Shortly after the war ended, on 31 July 1945, an explosion of the local ammunition depot triggered a pogrom of the German population, known as the Ústí massacre, mostly at the hands of out-of-town paramilitary groups. Whilst the official investigation blamed the explosion on German saboteurs, more recent historical work points towards it being a communist provocation, intended to effect the subsequent expulsion of Germans. Between 80 and a thousand people died in the event, with estimates varying widely, but being generally much higher than the official body count.

Under the terms of the Potsdam Conference and the Beneš decrees, the city was restored to Czechoslovakia and almost the totality of its previous population expelled as being German. In May 1948, the Communist government passed a new constitution declaring a people's republic. Communism continued until the 1989 fall of the Berlin Wall set off a series of events which are now known as the Velvet Revolution. Today, Ústí nad Labem is a major industrial city of the Czech Republic with substantial chemical, metallurgical, textile, food, and machine tool industries.

Matiční Street Wall

The city gained notoriety in the late 1990s when a  wall was constructed along part of the Matiční Street separating houses on one side from the tenement blocks on the other. Since the latter were homes mainly to Romani, it turned into an international scandal. Mayor Ladislav Hruška promised local homeowners' representatives that the wall would be finished by the end of September, 1998. Foreign journalists travelled to Ústí nad Labem to investigate, and were told by councillors that the wall was not meant to segregate by race, but to keep respectable citizens safe from noise and rubbish coming from the opposite side of the street.

In September, city representatives announced that plans would be changed from a four-metre soundproof wall to a 1.8-metre wall of ceramic bricks, and a children's playground would also be constructed in front of the tenement blocks. Despite these changes, the Roma Civic Initiative and Deputy Prime Minister Vladimír Špidla vocally opposed the construction. The wall was criticised by U.S. Congressman Christopher Smith, and a delegation from the Council of Europe described it as a "racist" and drastic solution.

The new plans slated construction to begin 30 August 1999, but a decision by the district office delayed the move because a wall that large would require a permit, and threatened to damage the root systems of trees along Matični Street. On 5 October however, construction began regardless of the opposition by foreign observers and members of the Czech government. The following day, 50 Roma physically blockaded construction of the wall and dismantled parts that had already been set up. Nonetheless, the wall was completed on 13 October. Domestic and international pressure eventually persuaded the city to dismantle the wall, and it was demolished six weeks after it had been erected. The local zoo uses parts of this ceramic fence as a wall around its main entrance to this day. The original wall was only 1.8 metres high and a few more rows of ceramic parts were needed to make it higher. Matiční Street is now uninhabited and its buildings are scheduled for demolition.

Demographics

Transport

Road transport
The city is connected to the international highway E 442 (Liberec, Děčín, Ústí, Dresden) and first class highways (I/8, I/30, I/13). It is also directly connected to the D8 motorway (Berlin – Prague) that intersects the western border of the city.

City mass transport
The city has a network of mass transport that includes bus and trolley bus lines.

Railway transport

Ústí nad Labem is an important railway node with four railway stations. The largest of these is Ústí nad Labem main railway station which is served by international EuroCity and InterCity trains. The backbone international line is the national railway line No. 090 – an international corridor traversing the Czech Republic from the border north of Děčín, through Ústí nad Labem and Prague, to the southeastern border at Břeclav. This line is part of the IV. Trans-European Multimodal Corridor.

River transport
The Elbe River Line is a junction with the West-European river lines opening access to Germany, Benelux countries, northern France and to important sea ports. The Elbe River Line is a part of the IV. Trans-European Multimodal Corridor. Freight transportation and pleasure cruises are run on the water line section Pardubice – Chvaletice – Ústí nad Labem – Hřensko – Hamburg.

Air transport
An airport for small sports planes (ICAO code LKUL) is located northwest of the city. The nearest airports for airliners are in Prague (64 km) and Dresden, Germany (56 km).

Education
The city is home of the Jan Evangelista Purkyně University in Ústí nad Labem. This public university has more than 12,000 students and with about 900 employees, it is one of the most important employers in the region.

Sport
The local ice hockey club HC Slovan Ústečtí Lvi, the association football club is FK Ústí nad Labem, which plays at the Municipal Stadium. The city also hosts the Ústí nad Labem Half Marathon, one of the World Athletics Label Road Races.

Sights

The Střekov Castle is one of the main sights of Ústí nad Labem. It is located in a southern suburb of the city.

The Church of the Assumption of the Virgin Mary was built in 1318 and is located in the city centre. It is well known for its leaning tower. It is the most leaning tower north of the Alps.

A significant landmark is the hill Větruše with an observation tower and the Větruše Castle, which was built in 1847 as a hotel and restaurant serving for cultural and social purposes.

In Krásné Březno part is located the Ústí nad Labem Zoo, founded in 1908, and the Krásné Březno Castle, built in 1566–1568 (nowadays seat of the branch of National Heritage Institute of the Czech Republic).

Mariánský Bridge

Mariánský Bridge is a road bridge over the Elbe which was built over a period of five years and opened in 1998. The city invested over CZK 750 million (US$37,500,000) to build it. The bridge won an award of the European Association of Steel Structures - ECCS (European Convention for constructional Steelwork) Steel Design Award 1999. International Association for Bridge and Structural Engineering ranked Mariánský Bridge between the 10 best structures of the world in the decade.

Notable people
Anton Raphael Mengs (1728–1779), painter
Mimi Wagensonner (1897–1970), composer
Felix Weinberg (1928–2012), physicist
Alfred Lipka (1931–2010), German violist
Vladimír Páral (born 1932), writer
Heinz Edelmann (1934–2009), illustrator and designer
Milan Hejduk (born 1976), ice hockey player
Jiří Jarošík (born 1977), footballer
Tomáš Černý (born 1985), footballer
Michal Neuvirth (born 1988), ice hockey player

Twin towns – sister cities

Ústí nad Labem is twinned with:
 Chemnitz, Germany
 Halton, England, United Kingdom

Ústí nad Labem also cooperates with Dresden, Germany.

Gallery

References

Sources

.
.

External links

Crystal Touch Museum
Architecture in Ústí nad Labem

 
Populated places in Ústí nad Labem District
Cities and towns in the Czech Republic
Romani communities in the Czech Republic
Populated riverside places in the Czech Republic
Populated places on the Elbe